NGC 7034 is an elliptical galaxy located about 380 million light-years away in the constellation of Pegasus. It is part of a pair of galaxies that contains the nearby galaxy NGC 7033. NGC 7034 was discovered by astronomer Albert Marth on September 17, 1863.

See also 
 NGC 4486 (M87)
 List of NGC objects (7001–7840)

References

External links 

 Elliptical galaxies
Pegasus (constellation)
11687
7034
66227
Astronomical objects discovered in 1863